Boriwen were subdivisions of three of the larger Thai monthon. Several mueang were grouped together into one boriwen. In 1908 the boriwen were renamed to changwat, which became the name of provinces countrywide in 1916.

The monthon with between three and five boriwen were Phayap, Udon Thani and Isan. Each boriwen was administrated by a commissioner (khaluang boriwen, ข้าหลวงบริเวณ). The administrative headquarters of the boriwen were located in the provincial town listed first:

Monthon Phayap
Boriwen Northern Chiangmai: Chiang Rai, Chiang Saen, Papao, Nongkhwang, and Fang
Boriwen Western Chiangmai: Mae Hong Son, Yuam, Khun Yuam, and Pai
Boriwen Northern Nan: Chiangkhong, Thoeng, Chiangkham, Chianglaeng, Chianglom, Chianghon (Khop and Kutsawadi were seceded to France in 1904)
Monthon Udon Thani
Boriwen Makkhaeng: Ban Makkhaeng (Udonthani), Nongkhai, Nonglahan, Kumphawapi, Kamutthasai, Phonphisai, and Rattanawapi
Boriwen Phachi: Khonkaen, Chonnabot, and Phuwiang
Boriwen That Phanom: Nakhon Phanom, Chaiburi, Tha Uthen and Mukdahan
Boriwen Sakon: Sakon Nakhon
Boriwen Nam Huang: Loei, Kaen Thao, Bo Tha
Monthon Isan
Boriwen Ubon: Ubon Ratchathani, Khemmarat, Yasothon
Boriwen Champassak (Bassac): Champassak (Bassac)
Boriwen Khukhan: Khukhan, Sisaket, and Det-udom
Boriwen Surin: Surin, and Sangkha
Boriwen Roi-et: Roi Et, Mahasarakham, Kalasin, Kammalasai, Suwannaphum

See also
Subdivisions of Thailand

References

Subdivisions of Thailand